The 2022 IBSF Junior World Championships in bobsleigh and skeleton took place in Innsbruck, Austria, from 21 to 23 January 2022.

Schedule
Twelve events took place.

All times are local (UTC+1).

Bobsleigh

Skeleton

Medal summary

Medal table

Bobsleigh

Junior

U23

Skeleton

Junior

U20

References

Junior World Championships
Junior World Championships
2022 in Austrian sport
2022 in youth sport
2022 IBSF Junior World Championships
Sports competitions in Innsbruck
January 2022 sports events in Austria